Collider is an entertainment website and digital video production company, with a focus on the film industry, television series, and video games.

Collider focuses on entertainment news, analysis, and commentary, along with original features. The website primarily covers film and television news, with complementary film and television reviews and editorials. , Collider YouTube channel had 626,000 subscribers and over 551,000,000 cumulative views. Former extensions of the channel include Movie Talk, Movie Trivia Schmoedown, Heroes, Jedi Council, Behind the Scenes & Bloopers, and Collider News. The channel had also branched out and produced content for other outlets, such as Awesometacular with Jeremy Jahns for go90.

Extensions of the main YouTube channel include Collider Podcasts (including a period named under Collider Live), Collider Interviews (formerly Collider Quick), Collider Games (later renamed Revog and presumably sold off), Collider Sports & Pro Wrestling Sheet. The website and channel has also expanded into producing podcasts for PodcastOne.

History
Collider was founded in 2005 by editor-in-chief Steven Weintraub as a blog. In 2015, Weintraub sold Collider to Complex Media, who would manage business and advertisements on the website and offer editing support. On November 17, 2020, Valnet announced that it had acquired Collider.

Movie Talk
Daily, the crew will share their perspective on the film industry, which will include film reviews and industry news. Each episode is approximately an hour in length. A segment called "Buy or Sell" (later renamed "Agree or Disagree") happens daily where the panel will discuss whether they see certain topics or announcements as favorable or unfavorable. Each episode will typically end with questions from the "mailbag" sent to email and from live tweets to the corresponding channel. The "Agree or Disagree" segment was later pulled entirely from the show. Previously airing at 9:00 AM, the show moved to a 4:00 PM timeslot in July 2018, followed by a 3:00 PM timeslot in May 2019. Along with the May 2019 timeslot change, the format was changed to now include live chat interaction during the show, nixing the live Twitter questions at the end of the program. In August 2019, it was announced that the program would be moving back to the earlier 9:00 AM timeslot along with additional segments and content. The show was cancelled in a statement released by Collider and Marc Fernandez on January 2, 2020.

Heroes
Heroes follows a similar format to Movie Talk, except the coverage is strictly on comic book film news. It was hosted by Jon Schnepp, who after his passing was succeeded by Amy Dallen and Coy Jandreau. Episodes revolve around the Marvel Cinematic Universe and the DC Extended Universe. The show also talks about comics-based TV series such as Arrow and The Flash on The CW or the MCU on Netflix. The show was cancelled in a statement released by Collider and Marc Fernandez on January 2, 2020.

Nightmares
Nightmares follows the same format as Movie Talk and Heroes to a horror-focused show. Hosted by Clarke Wolfe, it follows news on horror films and television. Regular co-hosts include Mark Reilly, Perri Nemiroff and Jon Schnepp. It was reduced from a weekly show to monthly installments in 2017 due to decreased viewership, and later was put on indefinite hiatus.

Movie Trivia Schmoedown

Introduced in March 2016 as a soft reboot of the 2014/2015 version previously hosted on the Schmoes Know YouTube channel (a separate YouTube channel owned and operated by Kristian Harloff and Mark Ellis, now named Schmoedown Entertainment Network) the Movie Trivia Schmoedown is a game show hosted by Harloff and Ellis where famous Collider or other YouTube cinema-related personalities engage in a film trivia competition. The show has a heavy professional wrestling influence in terms of storylines and gimmicks, although the competition itself is legitimate. There are currently four divisions: the singles, teams, Innergeekdom – a division with emphasis on DC, DC Extended Universe, Wizarding World, Marvel, Marvel Cinematic Universe, Star Trek, Star Wars, and Middle-earth questions; although, additionally, Back to the Future, Indiana Jones, and non-DC or Marvel comic book movie questions are frequently asked as well – and Star Wars-only. Despite the overhaul of the show's format in the move from Schmoes Know to Collider, all of the matches from the previous incarnation are still counted for players' records. Starting in 2019, the Movie Trivia Schmoedown was moved back to the Schmoes Know YouTube channel. The Schmoes Know channel changed its name to the Schmoedown Entertainment Network and started a partnership with Skybound. The Schmoedown has turned itself into a movie trivia sport, currently with eight factions: The Usual Suspects managed by Samm Levine, KOrruption managed by Shannon Barney, The Stars managed by Roxy Striar, The Den managed by Kate Mulligan, S.W.A.G managed by Winston Marshall, The Quirky Mercs managed by Coy Jandreau, The Finstock Exchange managed by Tom Dagnino and The Dungeon managed by John Kaiser. Each faction has 12 players, each competing in one or more of the four divisions for a chance to get the championship belts at the Schmoedown Spectacular in December. Currently the sport is being played virtually which has changed some of the game's format such as the buzzer round.

As of 2017, the traditional format sees the opponents engage in a three-round match:
 in the first round, they have to write down on a white board the answers to eight questions of different categories, getting a point for every correct answer (with the possibility of a bonus ninth question should they get all eight correct);
 in the second round, they spin a wheel which will randomly land on a single category (they may spin a second time should they feel that the category is not a strong one for them unless it lands on Opponents Choice). They will then answer up to four (or six, if teams) questions in that category, receiving two points for a correct answer, and the added option of multiple choice which cuts down a correct answer to only one point, as well as the looming risk of a competitor stealing point(s);
 the third round sees the choosing of three numbers from 1–20 at random, all of them containing a category that they have to answer a question from, with each being worth two, three and five points respectively. In the championship match format, instead of third, this is the fifth round of the contest.

Championship matches feature two extra rounds:
 the waging round, or the third round in championship match format, where the competitors can wage from zero up to three of their earned points at that time, and answer a question from another wheel-spun category, getting an additional number of points (the number being the same number they waged) if they get it correct, and losing those same points if they fail;
 the speed round, or the fourth round in championship match format, in which the competitors must hit the buzzer before their opponent and answer the given question correctly within two seconds, also with the added risk of losing a point if they answer incorrectly.

The contestant(s) that has the most accumulated points at the end of the final round wins. If the scores are level at this point, there is a Sudden Death round, in which all competitors are asked the same questions and must answer on their white boards with a point being awarded for each correct answer. Whoever leads first wins. If there is more than a ten-point lead before the final round the leader will win by "knockout". If the competitor does make it to the final round but cannot correctly answer enough of the three questions to catch up to their opponent, they lose by "TKO".
 
There is a challenge rule, where the competitor(s) can challenge a decision made by the judges. If the judges accept the challenge, the same person(s) gets to keep the challenge and possibly use it again, but if they do not, then the contestant(s) cannot challenge any other call in that respective game. There is also the "JTE rule", the name given to the rule that stipulates that the competitor(s) may ask for a given question to be repeated up to three times per match.

Specialty matches:
 Triple Threat, Fatal 4-Way and Fatal 5-Way: structured the same way as regular matches, but adapted for the number of participants involved (i.e.: in a Triple Threat, each of the three competitors spins the wheel in the second round, and steal opportunities are available for both opponents through white board writing instead of just spoken) (also: the number of questions asked to a given competitor in Round 2 drops from four to three). The first of this format was the Innergeekdom Fatal 5-Way title match at the 2016 Schmoedown Spectacular;
 Elimination match: multiple participants are tested in a game of survival, as they have to avoid being the contestant with the fewest accumulated points after a round of questions is asked, or they are eliminated (and there are eliminations every round). This is usually applicable to the older format of InnerGeekdom division Fatal 5-Way matches, as well as the Free 4 All;
 Free 4 All: an event based on WWE's Royal Rumble match, where five of a high number of players (the highest number of participants so far having been 48) start at the table, and as some get eliminated through the elimination process, others - in random order - enter in their spots. The winner of the Free 4 All gets a title shot of any kind anytime they desire. The inaugural edition took place in 2017, and it takes place annually in April;
 Retirement match: The loser of this match has to retire from the Schmoedown, either for a period of time or permanently. The first example was Josh Macuga vs. Finstock, however Tom Dagnino (A.K.A. Finstock) managed to escape retirement through a loop-hole;
 Loser Breaks Up match: This is similar to the Retirement match, but exclusive for the teams division, where the losing team has to permanently break up. The first example was Wangers vs. Reel Rejects;
 Iron Man match: a 30-minute non-stop marathon of trivia questions being asked, with the winner being the one with the most answered questions by the end of the time limit. The 1st one of its kind was Ken Napzok vs. Sam Witwer at the Schmoedown Spectacular II.

The Schmoedown has four annual big events:
 Free 4 All, the aforementioned Royal Rumble-esque event in April;
 Collider Collision, a SummerSlam-inspired supercard that takes place in July;
 Ultimate Schmoedown, a bracket-style tournament to declare the next #1 contender to the singles (and/or team) title(s), during late summer–fall;
 Schmoedown Spectacular, the WrestleMania-like biggest supercard of the year, which hits on late December.

In addition to the main leagues on Collider'''s YouTube channel, the show also has its own Patreon, which, depending on which tier a Patron pledges to, can give early access to one (per month) of the scheduled matches, and also features exhibition matches not accounting for league rankings made exclusively for Patrons. Other perks (such as the possibility to audition for Schmoedown competition) are given at higher tiers/pledges. As of November 2018, the Schmoedown has its own website as well.

After airing a 3-part video of Schmoedown Spectacular III, Harloff announced that the show will no longer be aired on the channel and would be moved back to the Schmoes Know channel.

On July 1, 2022 the Schmoedown announced that it will be ending after 9 seasons with the final episode airing on October 1, 2022.

Collider News
Hosted by various members, these videos are typically short segments ranging from one to two minutes in length. These short videos discuss upcoming movies, new trailer drops, celebrity controversy, or filming and production issues on set. These short pieces are uploaded shortly after breaking news. Each short ends as the host asks the viewers their opinion on the story and encourages fans to post comments for further discussion on the next episode of the Movie Talk panels.

Collider Crash CourseCollider Crash Course videos cover a variety of topics that are designed to enlighten viewers. The segments vary in length and are hosted by an alternating group of staff.

Collider Behind the Scenes & BloopersCollider Behind the Scenes & Bloopers videos, which feature Perri Nemiroff hosting, offer viewers a look behind the scenes of the other shows, as well as interviewing staff on a variety of topics.

Comic Book Shopping
Hosted by Jon Schnepp, these videos showcase celebrities and comic book writers shopping for and discussing comics and graphic novels. In March 2019, it was announced that the series was being revived with Coy Jandreau succeeding the late Schnepp. 

1x1 with Kristian Harloff
Hosted by Kristian Harloff, the videos show hour-long interviews with celebrity guests.

Collider Live
Introduced in 2018, this live program featured a rotating panel of staff, and featured a more loose atmosphere. Topics are wide-ranging, from film and media news, everyday lives of staff, etc. Celebrity guests often appear to discuss projects and other topics. Hosted by Kristian Harloff and later by Roxy Striar and Dorina Arellano, the show moved to its own separate channel beginning on May 20, 2019. The show was cancelled in a statement released by Collider'' and Marc Fernandez on January 2, 2020.

Movie Review Talk
Hosted by Scott Mantz, who provides film reviews of opening releases. The series was canceled due to low viewership,        
with the final episode airing on February 15, 2019.

For Your Consideration
Introduced in 2018, this series offers commentary, discussion and coverage of the upcoming major awards season, including potential Academy Awards contenders, TIFF coverage of buzzed-about films, etc. The series is hosted primarily by Perri Nemiroff and Jeff Sneider, with Scott Mantz and Steve Weintraub providing additional opinions.

Staff

Collider.com's staff of writers includes Deputy Editor Adam Chitwood, Senior Editor Matt Goldberg (Film), Senior Editor Allison Keene (TV), Editor Haleigh Foutch (Horror), Editor Dave Trumbore (Animation), Weekend Editor Chris Cabin, Staff Writer Christina Radish, and Social Media Manager Dorian Parks. Current contributors include Evan Valentine, Kayti Burt, Jennifer McHugh, Carla Day, Vinnie Mancuso, Nick Romano, Craig Byrne, Tommy Cook, Emma Fraser, and Christian Smith. Past staff writers included Jason Barr, Brendan Bettinger, Brian Formo, Aubrey Page, Nicole Pedersen, Jeff Sneider and Josh Macuga.

Collider's staff includes Dennis Tzeng, Perri Nemiroff, Coy Jandreau, Dorian Parks, Haleigh Foutch, Dorina Arellano and Scott Mantz. Past notable staff includes John Campea, David Griffin, Sasha Perl-Raver, Jeremy Jahns, Miri Jedeikin, Ashley Mova, Sinead De Vries, Natasha Martinez, Clarke Wolfe, Grace Hancock, Halleta Alemu, Jay Washington, Robert Meyer Burnett, Jon Schnepp, Mark Ellis, Kristian Harloff, John Rocha, Mark Reilly, Josh Macuga, Ken Napzok, Wendy Lee, Amy Dallen, Jeff Sneider and Roxy Striar.

References

External links
 
 

Internet properties established in 2005
American entertainment news websites
American film review websites